The Ialomița is a river of Southern Romania. It rises from the Bucegi Mountains in the Carpathians. It discharges into the Borcea branch of the Danube in Giurgeni. Ialomița County takes its name from this river.

The upper reach of the river is sometimes known as Valea Obârșiei or Obârșia Ialomiței.

Localities
The following localities are situated along the river Ialomița, from source to mouth: Moroeni, Pietroșița, Fieni, Pucioasa, Doicești, Aninoasa, Târgoviște, Răzvad, Comișani, Băleni, Finta, Cojasca, Poienarii Burchii, Fierbinți-Târg, Dridu, Urziceni, Manasia, Alexeni, Ion Roată, Sfăntu Gheorghe, Balaciu, Căzănești, Ciochina, Andrășești, Perieți, Slobozia, Cosâmbești, Bucu, Sudiți and Țăndărei.

The largest cities along the Ialomița are Târgoviște and Slobozia.

Tributaries
The following rivers are tributaries to the river Ialomița (from source to mouth):

Left: Valea Șugărilor, Cocora, Lăptici, Scândurari, Blana, Nucet, Oboarele, Scropoasa, Orzea, Brândușa, Gâlma, Ialomicioara (I), Rușeț, Bizdidel, Slănic de Răzvad, Slănic, Pâscov, Crivăț, Cricovul Dulce, Prahova, Sărata, Cotorca, Sărățuica, Fundata, Valea Lată Sărată
Right: Valea Doamnelor, Valea Sucheniței, Horoaba, Coteanu, Valea Văcăriei, Tătaru, Gâlgoiu, Mircea, Bolboci, Lucăcilă, Zănoaga, Valea Cabanierului, Brătei, Izvorul Rătei, Raciu, Valea Doicii, Seciul cu Colți, Voivodeni, Țâța, Ialomicioara (II), Vulcana, Izvor, Racovița, Sticlărie, Snagov, Cociovaliștea, Comana

Lakes and dams
Lake Scropoasa
Lake Snagov

History
The Naparis River, mentioned in Histories Book 4, is likely the modern Ialomița. The Naparis was one of five Scythian Rivers listed by Herodotus which began in Scythia and fed into the Danube.

References

Rivers of Romania
 
Rivers of Prahova County
Rivers of Dâmbovița County
Rivers of Ilfov County
Rivers of Ialomița County
Place names of Slavic origin in Romania